Mohau Mokate (born 18 June 1991) is a South African soccer player who plays as a centre forward for Polokwane City. He has represented the South Africa national football team.

Club career
Born in Rustenburg, Mokate started his career at Orbit College, before signing for Maritzburg United in 2014.

After leaving Maritzburg United in August 2019, he signed for Ajax Cape Town two months later.

In January 2021, Mokate signed for TS Sporting.

International career
After making his debut for South Africa on 2 July 2017, Mokate scored his first goal for South Africa on 7 July 2017 with the only goal of the 2017 COSAFA Cup final against Namibia.

References

External links
 
 

1991 births
Living people
South African soccer players
People from Rustenburg
Association football forwards
South Africa international soccer players
Maritzburg United F.C. players
Cape Town Spurs F.C. players
TS Sporting F.C. players
Polokwane City F.C. players
South African Premier Division players
National First Division players